Second Lady/Second Gentleman of India is the title given to the host of Uparashtrapati Bhavan, usually the spouse of the Vice President of India. The current Second Lady of India is Dr. (Smt.) Sudesh Dhankhar, the spouse of the incumbent Vice President of India Shri Jagdeep Dhankhar.

List

See also
 Vice President of India
 First ladies and gentlemen of India
 Spouse of the prime minister of India

Notes

References

India
Vice Presidents
India politics-related lists